Huaniu (花牛), also known as Chinese Red Delicious is an apple cultivar originating from China. It is named after Huaniu town, Tianshui, where it was first planted as a hybrid of 10 varieties of apple trees, including Red Delicious, Golden Delicious and Ralls Janet in 1956. In 1965, Huaniu farmers sent two boxes of apples to Chairman Mao to express their respect for him. Mao thanked the villagers, noting that he was very fond of the apple's taste. That same year, the apples were exported to Hong Kong. The name of the village of Huaniu was put on the box, and the apples were preferred over the US-imported Red Delicious. Since then, Huaniu apples have been well known in China. The apple has a sweet taste comparable with Fuji apples. The apples have a soluble solid contents of 12.5-14%, sugar content of 1.86%, and malic acid content of 0.08%.

It is nowadays grown in the southeast of Gansu province, around Tianshui and in Shanxi.

Black diamond
A variety of Huaniu apples called black diamond has a deep purple colour, owing to high ultraviolet light influx and lower temperature at night at its locale, Nyingchi, Tibet.

References

Apple cultivars
Chinese apples